"Obviously" is a song by English pop rock band McFly. It was released as the second single from their debut studio album, Room on the 3rd Floor. The single itself features a cover version of Beatles single, "Help!", as well as the band's first recorded interview—part one of which can be found on CD2, with part two appearing on a limited edition 7-inch picture disc. The single was the band's second number-one single on the UK Singles Chart, where it stayed for one week. It also reached number 14 in Ireland.

Lyrics

The song is about the lead singer having a crush on a girl he knows is completely "out of [his] league". He really wants that girl, but he knows that he "never will be good enough for her". Even though he had given up and desperately wanted to ignore the fact, it was impossible to get rid of it.

Tom Fletcher wrote the song about his ex-girlfriend (and now wife), Giovanna, whom he had recently broken up with. Giovanna had since started dating a police officer and Tom did not know if he would ever get back with her. For the lyrics, the policeman's job was changed to Marines to make him, in Tom's own words, "sound harder".

Music video
The video features the boys as caddies in a golf game which features the characters mentioned in the song. The band members eventually have fun around the golf course on the buggies. Shots also involve them being in a hall where they play their instruments.

Track listings

Charts

Weekly charts

Year-end charts

Certifications

Other performances
The Derren Brown stage show Enigma ended with a video of McFly performing a version of the song in which Brown had ostensibly told them his prediction of the order in which randomly chosen members of the audience would shuffle a number of pictures.

References

2004 singles
2004 songs
Island Records singles
McFly songs
Number-one singles in Scotland
Song recordings produced by Hugh Padgham
Songs written by Danny Jones
Songs written by James Bourne
Songs written by Tom Fletcher
UK Singles Chart number-one singles